Gillot was a 17th/18th-century French theatre manager and playwright about whom we have no information except that he wrote farces and  puppets plays for the Théâtre de la foire Saint-Germain at the turn of the 17th and 18th centuries. We have four burlesque plays by him whose main character is Pulcinella from the commedia dell'arte:

1695: L'Enlèvement de Prosepine
1695: Le Marchand ridicule
1708: Polichinel Colin Maillar
? Polichinel grand Turque

External links 
 His plays and their presentations on CÉSAR 

17th-century French dramatists and playwrights
17th-century French male writers
18th-century French dramatists and playwrights
French theatre managers and producers